Alexander Stuart (April 19, 1857 – April 2, 1928) was an Ontario farmer and political figure. He represented Renfrew North in the Legislative Assembly of Ontario as a Conservative member from 1923 to 1928.

He was born in Wilberforce Township, the son of Charles Stuart. In 1884, he married Eliza Jane Burgess and then married Emma McCabe in 1904 after his first wife's death. He lived near Eganville and served 27 years as reeve for the township. He died at Renfrew on April 2, 1928.

References 

 Canadian Parliamentary Guide, 1928, AL Normandin

External links 

1857 births
1928 deaths
Progressive Conservative Party of Ontario MPPs